Joseph Alexander Wilson (28 March 1909 – 3 April 1984) was an English professional footballer who played as an inside right in the Football League for Newcastle United and Brighton & Hove Albion. He had a brief spell as caretaker manager of the latter club in 1963.

Life and career
Wilson was born in High Spen, County Durham, in 1909. His younger brother, Glen, also became a footballer.

Wilson played football for Spen Black and White, Winlaton Celtic and Tanfield Lea Institute before signing for Newcastle United, initially on amateur forms, in 1933. He impressed for their Central League team, and turned professional in September 1933. He made his senior debut on Christmas Day 1934 and scored in a 6–2 defeat of Hull City in the Second Division, and played regularly through the second half of that season. However, he fell out of favour, playing in only 14 matches in 1935–36, many of which were in positions other than his preferred inside right, and was made available for transfer at a fee of £500. He spoke to two Third Division South clubs, Cardiff City and Brighton & Hove Albion, and chose to sign for the latter; the fee paid was £450.

Wilson impressed with his pace and his ability on the ball, and was a regular in the side, although not always at inside right. In the three seasons running up to the Second World War, as Albion finished third, fifth and third, Wilson missed only nine matches in league and FA Cup. During the war he served as a Physical Training Instructor and when duty permitted, appeared for Albion in the wartime competitions. He resumed his career with appearances in all ten of Albion's 1945–46 FA Cup matches and 39 of their 42 fixtures in the first post-war league season. He then retired as a player and was appointed assistant to trainer Alex Wilson. When Alex Wilson left the club in 1952, Wilson succeeded him as trainer, a post he held for 18 years. In 1963, he had a brief spell as caretaker manager between George Curtis's departure and the arrival of Archie Macaulay. After five years as chief scout, he retired in 1974.

He remained in the Brighton area, where he died in 1984 at the age of 75.

Career statistics

Notes

References

1909 births
Military personnel from County Durham
1984 deaths
People from High Spen
Footballers from Tyne and Wear
English footballers
Association football inside forwards
Spen Black and White F.C. players
Newcastle United F.C. players
Brighton & Hove Albion F.C. players
English Football League players
English football managers
Brighton & Hove Albion F.C. managers
English Football League managers
Brighton & Hove Albion F.C. non-playing staff
British military personnel of World War II